William B. Ellern (born November 30, 1933) is an American science fiction author. Ellern has worked as an engineer, including for JPL, Raytheon, Boeing, Hughes Aircraft and Northrop Corporation.

He was born in Portland, Oregon to May Eileen Ellern and William C. Ellern.

In July 1965 he asked for, and received, permission from E. E. Smith to extend the Lensman series of novels.  After that he continued to produce science-fiction short stories, including "Moon Prospector" (Analog Science Fiction and Fact, 1966), "New Lensman" (serialized in 14 parts in Perry Rhodan #61-74, 1975) and "Triplanetary Agent" (serialized in 6 parts in Perry Rhodan #100-105, 1978).  There is a fourth unpublished story.

In 1976 New Lensman was published, which contained "Moon Prospector" along with the "New Lensman" serial from Perry Rhodan.  "Triplanetary Agent" has yet to be reprinted in book form.

Ellern served on the board of directors of the Los Angeles Science Fantasy Society until January 2009.

Ellern married Anne Morrel.

William Ellern has four children, William A., Scott A., Gillian D. and Lorita E.

References

 Cover of  April 1966 issue of Analog magazine, with "Moon prospector" story by William Ellern

External links
 

1933 births
Living people
20th-century American novelists
American male novelists
American science fiction writers
American male short story writers
Lensman series
20th-century American short story writers
20th-century American male writers